Saginaw is a city in the state of Michigan.

Saginaw may also refer to:

Places in the United States

In Michigan

 Saginaw Charter Township, Michigan, a township, containing two census-designated places:
Saginaw Township North, Michigan
 Saginaw Township South, Michigan
 Saginaw County, Michigan, a county in Michigan
 Saginaw River, a river in the state of Michigan
 Saginaw Bay, a bay within Lake Huron on the eastern side of the state of Michigan
 Saginaw Trail, a set of connected roads in Michigan
 Saginaw City, Michigan and East Saginaw, Michigan, former cities in Saginaw County, Michigan, that merged in 1890 to become the modern city of Saginaw

Other states
 Saginaw, Alabama, an unincorporated community
 Saginaw, Minnesota, an unincorporated area
 Saginaw, Missouri, a village
 Saginaw, Oregon, an unincorporated community
 Saginaw, Texas, a Fort Worth suburb

Ships
 USS Saginaw 
 USS Saginaw Bay (CVE-82)
 , a lake freighter operated by Lower Lakes Towing
 , a Design 1013 cargo ship

Automobiles
 Saginaw (automobile), a former automobile manufacturer (1914)
 Saginaw Motor Company, a name considered by the former automobile manufacturer Yale (1916)
 Saginaw Speedster, another name for Detroit Cyclecar, a former cyclecar

Other uses
 Saginaw Spirit, a hockey team playing in the Ontario Hockey League based in Saginaw, Michigan
 "Saginaw, Michigan" (song), a song by Lefty Frizzell
 Saginaw Valley State University, near Saginaw, Michigan
Saginaw Valley State Cardinals, its sports teams
 Saginaw Steering, a former division of General Motors, now known as Nexteer Automotive
 Treaty of Saginaw, a 19th-century land treaty in Michigan
 Fort Saginaw Mall, a former shopping center near Saginaw, Michigan
 Saginaw Chippewa Tribal Nation, a Native American tribe in Central Michigan
 Saginaw Chippewa Tribal College in Mount Pleasant, Michigan
 Roman Catholic Diocese of Saginaw